Lawrence B. Wilkerson (born June 15, 1945) is a retired United States Army Colonel and former chief of staff to United States Secretary of State Colin Powell. Since the end of his military career, Wilkerson has criticized many aspects of the Iraq War, including his own preparation of Powell's presentation to the UN, as well as other aspects of American policy in the Middle East. He is a lifelong Republican and firmly on the political right.

Education and early military service
Wilkerson was born in Gaffney, South Carolina. After three years of studying philosophy and English literature at Bucknell University, Wilkerson dropped out in 1966 and volunteered to serve in the Vietnam War. He told The Washington Post: "I felt an obligation because my dad had fought, and I thought that was kind of your duty."

Wilkerson arrived as an Army officer piloting an OH-6A Cayuse observation helicopter and logged about 1100 combat hours over a year. He flew low and slow through South Vietnam, and was involved in one incident in which he says he prevented a war crime by purposely placing his helicopter between a position that was full of civilians, and another helicopter that wanted to launch an attack on the position. He also had many vocal disagreements with his superiors and his own gunner crew over free-fire zones, including an incident in which one of his crew shot a wagon that wound up having a little girl inside it. He went on to Airborne School and Ranger School before receiving his Bachelor of Arts degree in English literature and graduate degrees in international relations and national security. He attended the Naval War College in Newport, Rhode Island, and later returned there to teach. He later served as deputy director of the Marine Corps War College at Quantico.

Assistant to Colin Powell
Wilkerson spent some years in the United States Navy's Pacific Command in South Korea, Japan and Hawaii, where he was well regarded by his superiors. These recommendations led in early 1989 to a successful interview to become the assistant to Colin Powell, who was then finishing his stint as National Security Advisor in the Reagan administration and moving to a position in the United States Army Forces Command at Fort McPherson. He continued this supporting role as Powell became Chairman of the Joint Chiefs of Staff through the Gulf War, following Powell into civilian life and then back into public service when President George W. Bush appointed Powell Secretary of State.

Wilkerson was responsible for the review of information from the Central Intelligence Agency used to prepare Powell for his February 2003 presentation to the United Nations Security Council. His failure to realize that the evidence was faulty has been attributed to the limited time (only one week) that he had to review the data. The subsequent developments led Wilkerson to become disillusioned: "Combine the detainee abuse issue with the ineptitude of post-invasion planning for Iraq, wrap both in this blanket of secretive decision-making...and you get the overall reason for my speaking out."

Later career
Wilkerson has worked as a Distinguished Adjunct Professor of Government and Public Policy at the College of William & Mary since January 2006, and taught national security affairs in the Honors Program at George Washington University from January 2006 until December 2011.

Wilkerson is one of the people interviewed in the 2007 documentary film No End in Sight, a film that is very critical of the way the occupation of Iraq was handled in the spring of 2003.

As of 2014, he served on the advisory board of the Military Religious Freedom Foundation.
 
In 2020, he was named a non-resident fellow of the Quincy Institute. According to Tablet magazine, in 2018-19, Wilkerson was in close contact with Trita Parsi of the National Iranian American Council as he developed and sought funding for the Institute.

Political positions and statements
Since his retirement from the public sector Wilkerson has on several occasions spoken out against what he perceives as the poor planning and execution of the Iraq War as well as the global politics leading up to and following it. In particular he has denounced the decision-making process of the Bush administration and Vice President Dick Cheney's and Secretary of Defense Donald Rumsfeld's parts in it, and regularly describes the Bush administration has having been run by a neoconservative cabal.

In the mid-2000s, he was a regular speaker at Ron Paul's Liberty Caucus. In a September 2006 conference call, Wilkerson expressed support for Wesley Clark and Anthony Zinni. He also endorsed Jim Webb against incumbent George Allen in the 2006 U.S. Senate election in Virginia.

Treatment of detainees in Iraq

Wilkerson made comments in a radio interview in November 2005 that the Vice President had decided that the Third Geneva Convention (regarding treatment of POWs) would not apply to "al-Qaeda and al-Qaeda look-alike detainees" and that the February 2002 White House memorandum regarding the "Humane Treatment of Taliban and al Qaeda Detainees" contained a loophole designed to avoid applying the Geneva convention to the detainees. According to Wilkerson, the phrase "the detainees (should) be treated humanely and, to the extent appropriate and consistent with military necessity, in a manner consistent with the principles of Geneva" was a way to appear to play by the rules while in reality, the "military necessities" would always overrule concerns about the plight of the detainees. Wilkerson said that this was result of Cheney and Rumsfeld working in collaboration to undermine the standard decision-making process of the White House (which included his superior, Colin Powell).

Iraq war intelligence was "a hoax"; the war was for oil and Israel
At a congressional hearing recorded on C-SPAN in June 2005, he gave his analysis of the Iraq war's motivation: "'I use the acronym OIL,' he said, 'O for oil, I for Israel and L for the logistical base necessary or deemed necessary by the so-called neocons – and it reeks through all their documents – the logistical base whereby the United States and Israel could dominate that area of the world.'" He said Israeli Prime Minister Ariel Sharon "has our president wrapped around his little finger" and that Bush has been "mesmerized" by Sharon.

During an October 19, 2005 speech at the New America Foundation, Wilkerson criticized the intelligence community which compiled the Iraq War intelligence:

Wilkerson did a full-length audio commentary for the documentary Why We Fight. This film won the Grand Jury Prize for Documentary at the 2005 Sundance Film Festival.

In a 2006 interview, Wilkerson said that the speech Powell made before the United Nations on February 5, 2003—which laid out a case for war with Iraq—included falsehoods of which Powell had never been made aware. He said, "My participation in that presentation at the UN constitutes the lowest point in my professional life. I participated in a hoax on the American people, the international community and the United Nations Security Council." Wilkerson said in 2011 that his preparing of the presentation was "probably the biggest mistake of my life", he regrets it, and that he regrets not resigning over it.

He stated in the 2006 interview that neither CIA Director George Tenet nor the CIA analysts that gave Powell information on mobile biological laboratories explained that there were disputes about the reliability of the informants who had supplied the information—information which was used in the speech. Wilkerson also agreed with the interviewer that Cheney's frequent trips to the CIA would have brought "undue influence" on the agency.  When asked if Cheney was "the kind of guy who could lean on somebody" he responded, "Absolutely. And be just as quiet and taciturn about it as-- he-- as he leaned on 'em. As he leaned on the Congress recently-- in the-- torture issue." Wilkerson stood by his earlier description of Cheney and Rumsfeld as having formed a cabal to hijack the decision-making process: "I'm worried and I would rather have the discussion and debate in the process we've designed than I would a diktat from a dumb strongman... I'd prefer to see the squabble of democracy to the efficiency of dictators."

An Iranian overture, 2003
Wilkerson said in an interview on the BBC's Newsnight, January 17, 2007, that an Iranian offer to help stabilise Iraq after the American invasion, was positively received at the State Department, yet turned down by Dick Cheney. The reported offer consisted of help in stabilizing Iraq, cutting ties with Hezbollah and greater transparency in its nuclear program in return for lifting sanctions and dismantling the Mujahedeen-e Khalq, an organisation working to overthrow the Iranian government.

The Iraq war and the "Jewish lobby"
In 2006, he told Robert Dreyfuss of American Prospect that he wondered if the "primary allegiance" of Doug Feith and other "neocons" in the Bush Defense Department "was to their own country or to Israel."

In April 2007, Wilkerson was featured in VPRO's Tegenlicht Dutch documentary The Israel Lobby. He said that "the Jewish lobby in America" and "AIPAC in particular" played an outsize influence in the run-up to Iraq war. Wilkerson noted Jewish officials such as Elliott Abrams, Paul Wolfowitz and Richard Perle in particular.

Guantanamo continues to hold innocent men
In March 2009, Wilkerson wrote on The Washington Note blog that he knew from briefings as a Bush administration official that it was soon recognized that some of the captives were innocent. Wilkerson said the Bush administration was willing to continue to detain innocent men who might nevertheless be aware of useful information about the Afghanistan "mosaic":
{| class="wikitable" border="1"
|
It did not matter if a detainee were innocent. Indeed, because he lived in Afghanistan and was captured on or near the battle area, he must know something of importance.
...sufficient information about a village, a region, or a group of individuals, that dots could be connected and terrorists or their plots could be identified.
|}

Wilkerson stated in 2009 that Guantanamo Bay detention camp continues to hold innocent men.
Wilkerson said that he felt compelled to come forward after hearing former Vice President Dick Cheney state that President Barack Obama's plans to close Guantanamo made the public less safe. Commander Jeffrey Gordon, a Guantanamo spokesman, declined to comment on Wilkerson's specific observations. Gordon said that "dealing with foreign fighters from a wide variety of countries in a wartime setting was a complex process."

In The New Republic, Jamie Kirchick criticised the plausibility of Wilkerson's allegations, calling him a "third-rate conspiracy theorist and a borderline bigot".

Chemical weapons in Syria
In 2013, Wilkerson speculated that Israel had used chemical weapons in Syria. Wilkerson suggested the Ghouta chemical attack was an Israeli false flag operation to discredit Bashar Assad's government in Syria.

Iran's democracy

In a March 20, 2015 CNN interview, Wilkerson said,
I would say very, very candidly that Iran is probably the most democratic country in the Persian gulf region right now. My Republican colleagues will boil their eyes at that, but it is the most democratic country. It's a theocracy, no question about it. But it is possessed of the democratic tendencies that far outweigh those of, say, Bahrain or Saudi Arabia or even Egypt.

Antisemitism controversies
In 2016, Michael Rubin of the American Enterprise Institute criticed Wilkerson for having "descended into a fevered swamp of conspiracy and hate." Rubin cited his Israel false flag theories about chemical weapons, alleged he "has flirted on the margins with 9/11 conspiracy theories", is regularly a guest on antisemitic state broadcasters Russia Today and Press TV, and is close to Lyndon LaRouche associate Robert Dreyfuss.

Trump administration foreign policy
Wilkerson showed concern over the Trump Administration's foreign policy behavior, particularly on Iran and Trump's work against the Iran nuclear deal.

In September 2018, Wilkerson further said that the neoconservative agenda regarding war on Syria and Iran also threatens conflict between the U.S. and Russia and the long-term bogging down of U.S. military forces in major conflict. Wilkerson stated: "My serious concern is about the way U.S. National Security Advisor John Bolton and others in their positions of power now are orchestrating a scenario whereby Donald Trump, for political reasons or whatever, can use force in a significant way against Assad and ultimately Iran, because Iran's forces are there, and ultimately against Russia, because their forces are there in Syria, and this is most disquieting." The neoconservatives' military plan, argues Wilkerson, is "a recipe for" the U.S. military being in the region for "the next generation" with significant force "mired even deeper in this morass" and with the "day after day" attrition of dollars and lives.

Role of military relative to climate change

Wilkerson stated in a 2022 Massachusetts Peace Action YouTube video, that climate change and nuclear war overshadow all other concerns.  In a May 2022 editorial for the Quincy Institute, he considered the role of the U.S. and other militaries in coping with famines that result from climate change and war.

Personal life

Wilkerson heads the Colin Powell Leadership Club, a group of MacFarland middle school students in Washington, D.C. His wife, Barbara Ann Wilkerson, passed away last year at the age of 71.

Awards
Wilkerson was the 2009 recipient of the Sam Adams Award for Integrity in Intelligence.

References

External links

 "Colonel Finally Saw Whites of Their Eyes", Dana Milbank, The Washington Post, 20 October 2005
 Transcript of Wilkerson's speech at the New America Foundation, Washington Note Archives, October 19, 2005.
 Lawrence Wilkerson. "The White House Cabal", Los Angeles Times, October 25, 2005.
 Transcript of Wilkerson interview, BBC Today program, 29 November 2005
 Interview with Lawrence Wilkerson: "A Leaderless, Directionless Superpower", Der Spiegel, December 6, 2005
 Transcript of Wilkerson Interview, PBS NOW (series), "Iraq Pre-War Intelligence," February 3, 2006. "... I'd prefer to see the squabble of democracy to the efficiency of dictators."
 "They Have Stolen My Party and I Want it Back", blog piece, The Washington Note, 22 March 2006
 Interview where Colonel Wilkerson gives examples of Cheney and Rumsfeld's influence., National Public Radio, November 3, 2005.
 Sworn Testimony over prisoners held in Guantanamo

1945 births
Living people
United States Army personnel of the Vietnam War
American people of the Iraq War
American whistleblowers
College of William & Mary faculty
Critics of neoconservatism
Elliott School of International Affairs faculty
George Washington University faculty
Naval War College alumni
Non-interventionism
People from Gaffney, South Carolina
South Carolina Republicans
United States Army colonels
United States Department of State officials